Eva Terčelj (born 21 January 1992) is a Slovenian slalom canoeist who has competed at the international level since 2007.

She won four medals in at the ICF Canoe Slalom World Championships with a gold (K1: 2019), a silver (K1 team: 2022) and two bronzes (K1 team: 2010, 2013). She also won a gold and a silver medal at the European Championships.

Terčelj competed at two Olympic Games. She finished in 13th place in the K1 event at the 2012 Summer Olympics in London after being eliminated in the semifinal. She also competed in the K1 event at the delayed 2020 Summer Olympics in Tokyo, finishing 24th after, once again, being eliminated in the semifinal.

In 2010 Eva Terčelj finished the Bežigrad Grammar School and in 2018 received a master's degree in architecture from the Faculty of Architecture at the University of Ljubljana.

World Cup individual podiums

References

2010 ICF Canoe Slalom World Championships 11 September 2010 K1 women's team final results. – accessed 11 September 2010.

External links

Living people
Slovenian female canoeists
1992 births
Canoeists at the 2012 Summer Olympics
Olympic canoeists of Slovenia
Sportspeople from Ljubljana
Medalists at the ICF Canoe Slalom World Championships
Canoeists at the 2020 Summer Olympics
20th-century Slovenian women
21st-century Slovenian women